The Philippine Open was one of the world's longest-running men's golf tournaments. First held in 1913, it is also Asia's oldest golf tournament.

History
The event was held in a variety of different golf courses around the Philippines and was an official money event on the Asian Tour from 1999 to 2015, having previously been a founding tournament on the Asia Golf Circuit. In March 2006 the National Golf Association of the Philippines granted all marketing rights for the tournament from 2006 to 2010 to the Asian Tour, which announced an aspiration to increase the prize fund from the 2006 level of US$200,000 to $1 million. In 2014, the prize fund was $300,000.

The 1967 event included a full-field of 160 players.

Venues
The following venues have been used since the founding of the Philippine Open in 1913.

Winners

Multiple winners
The players who have won the Philippine Open more than once are the following:
12 wins
Larry Montes (1929, 1932, 1936, 1937, 1941–1944, 1948, 1951, 1953, 1954)
6 wins
Celestino Tugot (1949, 1955–1958, 1962)
5 wins
J.R.H. Mason (a) (1913, 1914, 1918, 1921, 1927)
3 wins
Lu Liang-Huan (1965, 1974, 1978)
Ben Arda (1961, 1963, 1979)
2 wins
Ian Collier Trotter MacGregor (a) (1919, 1920)
Norman Von Nida (1938, 1939)
Hsieh Yung-yo (1970, 1977)
Lu Hsi-chuen (1980, 1983)
Frankie Miñoza (1998, 2007)

Notes

References

External links
Coverage on the Asian Tour's official site
Golf Today

Asia Golf Circuit events
Former Asian Tour events
Golf tournaments in the Philippines
Recurring sporting events established in 1913
Recurring sporting events disestablished in 2015
1913 establishments in the Philippines
2015 disestablishments in the Philippines